German submarine U-976 was a Type VIIC U-boat of Nazi Germany's Kriegsmarine during World War II.

She was ordered on 5 June 1941, and was laid down on 9 July 1942 at Blohm & Voss, Hamburg, as yard number 176. She was launched on 25 March 1943 and commissioned under the command of Oberleutnant zur See Raimund Tiesler on 5 May 1943.

Design
German Type VIIC submarines were preceded by the shorter Type VIIB submarines. U-976 had a displacement of  when at the surface and  while submerged. She had two shafts and two  propellers.

U-976 was fitted with five  torpedo tubes (four fitted at the bow and one at the stern), fourteen torpedoes or 26 TMA mines, one  SK C/35 naval gun, 220 rounds, and one twin  C/30 anti-aircraft gun. The boat had a complement of between 44 — 52 men.

Service history
On 25 March 1944, U-976 was sunk by aerial gunfire southwest of St. Nazaire, France, in the Bay of Biscay. U-976 was attacked by four British Mosquito FB VIs and two Mosquito FB.XVIIIs (nicknamed Tsetse), armed with 6-pounder  cannon, of 248 Squadron/L & I RAF. Forty-nine of the crew of fifty-three survived.

Wolfpacks
U-976 took part in six wolfpacks, namely:
 Coronel 1 (14 – 17 December 1943)
 Amrum (18 – 23 December 1943)
 Rügen 4 (23 – 28 December 1943)
 Rügen 6 (28 December 1943 – 2 January 1944)
 Rügen 5 (2 – 7 January 1944)
 Rügen  (7 – 26 January 1944)

References

Bibliography

External links

 Tsetse pilot's account of the sinking of U-976.

German Type VIIC submarines
U-boats commissioned in 1943
World War II submarines of Germany
Ships built in Hamburg
1943 ships
Maritime incidents in March 1944
World War II shipwrecks in the Atlantic Ocean